Emblyna sublata is a species of mesh web weaver in the spider family Dictynidae. It is found in the United States.

References

External links

 

Dictynidae
Articles created by Qbugbot
Spiders described in 1850